The Network Information Center Argentina, or  NIC Argentina, is an office of the Legal and Technical Secretariat of the Presidency of Argentina responsible for operating the .ar country code top-level domain (ccTLD).

Delegation for the .ar ccTLD, was requested on 20 August 1987, as part of the transition to the Internet Domain Name System. The delegation was approved and became effective on 13 September 1987. Since then, the Argentine Foreign Ministry has been the sole sponsor and entity responsible for the management of Internet Domain Names for the .AR ccTLD, this role was reaffirmed by Executive Decree 267/2005 on 4 April 2005.

Until Argentina was able to establish its first permanent connection to the global Internet, name services were provided by UUNET.

The NIC-DDN WHOIS entry for AR-DOM in 1991 showed:

Ministerio de Relaciones Exteriores y Culto (AR-DOM)
   Departamento de Informatica
   Recoquista 1088
   Buenos Aires - 1003
   ARGENTINA

   Domain Name: AR

   Administrative Contact:
      Porter, Sergio  (SP48)  SERGIOP@ATINA.AR
      +54 1-311-0071
   Technical Contact:
      Amodio, Jorge Marcelo  (JMA49)  PETE@ATINA.AR
      +54 1313 8082
   Zone Contact:
      Chapman, Malcom  (MC328)  malcom@atina.ar
      +54 1-313-8082

   Record last updated on 24-Mar-91.

   Domain servers in listed order:

   NS.UU.NET                    137.39.1.3
   UUCP-GW-1.PA.DEC.COM         16.1.0.18

   Top Level domain for Argentine Republic

   For information concerning this domain, please consult
   the Administrative Contact listed above.

Current contact information for the .AR ccTLD can be obtained from the IANA Root Zone Database.

References

External links
 Network Information Center Argentina (NIC) - official site.
 Historia y Evolucion de Internet en Argentina - (Spanish only)

Domain name registries
Internet in Argentina